MCSO may refer to:

Law enforcement
 Maricopa County Sheriff's Office, Arizona
 Mecklenburg County Sheriff’s Office (Virginia)
 Monroe County Sheriff's Office (New York)
 Montgomery County Sheriff's Office (Maryland)
 Multnomah County Sheriff's Office, Oregon

Other
 Medical Center of Southeastern Oklahoma